The TCR South America Touring Car Championship is a touring car racing series based in South America first held in 2021, which uses the TCR Touring Car regulations.

Background
The introduction of the new South American-based TCR Championship was announced on 4 March 2020, with Néstor Girolami saying “I think it’s the right time for South America to have a TCR series.” He continued with “It is a perfect opportunity and the most important in my view is that young drivers may join with the aim of climbing the hierarchy and, eventually, arriving on top to the WTCR. As a Honda driver I would be delighted to represent the brand in this new series to showcase their product in South America.”

Head of the championship is Felipe McGough who was formerly a part of the South American Super Touring Car Championship and Maurizio Slaviero who was the Stock Car Brasil President. The sporting director is Honda Racing Super TC2000 team director Victor Rosso and technical chief Samuel Canca Ruiz, who is a race engineer.

Circuits

The championship consists of circuits in Argentina, Brazil, and Uruguay:

 Bold denotes a circuit will be used in the 2023 season.

Notes

Champions

Notes

References

External links

 

TCR Series
Motorsport competitions in Argentina
Motorsport competitions in Brazil
Motorsport competitions in Uruguay
2021 establishments in Argentina
2021 establishments in Brazil
2021 establishments in Uruguay